Rajat Moona is the Director of Indian Institute of Technology Gandhinagar. He has served as director at Indian Institute of Technology, Bhilai. He was also a professor of Computer Science and Engineering at IIT Kanpur and Director General of Centre for Development of Advanced Computing.

Early life
He completed his BTech in Electrical Engineering from Indian Institute of Technology Kanpur. He earned his doctoral degree from the Department of Computer Science and Automation at Indian Institute of Science Bangalore, in 1989, under the supervision of Vaidyeswaran Rajaraman.

Work
He joined at IIT Kanpur as a faculty member in 1991. Between 1994 and 1995, he was a visiting scientist at the Computer Science and Artificial Intelligence Laboratory (CSAIL), Massachusetts Institute of Technology. Later he was also associated with Mentor Graphics as Senior Engineering Manager. Here was involved in developing methods of translating software codes of electronic systems into hardware.

During his tenure at IIT Kanpur, he was involved in development of a smart card operating system for Electronic Passports. At C-DAC, he was instrumental on the SCOSTA compliant operating system development, and the technical improvements behind the Electronic Toll Collection (ETC) in India and Electronic Voting Machine (EVM) that uses RFID.

Honor and awards
Indo-US Science and Technology Fellowship (1994)
Poonam and Prabhu Goel Chair Professorship (2008)
VASVIK Industrial Research Award in Information and Communication Technology (2010)
National Award for Best Electoral Practices, Election Commission of India (2016)
National Award for Best Electoral Practices, Election Commission of India (2020-21)

Selected bibliography

Articles

Patents
Compiling memory dereferencing instructions from software to hardware in an electronic design (2004)
Methods and systems for secured access to devices and systems (2006)
Method and system for using personal devices for authentication and service access at service outlets (2009)

Books

References

Living people
IIT Kanpur alumni
Indian Institute of Science alumni
Indian Institute of Technology directors
People from Uttar Pradesh
Year of birth missing (living people)